David Wilson is an American Republican Party politician currently serving as a member from the Connecticut House of Representatives from the 66th district, which includes the towns of Bethlehem, Morris, Warren, and parts of Litchfield and Woodbury, since 2017.

Career
Wilson was first elected in 2016 by a 12-point margin over Democrat Gayle Carr. Wilson was re-elected in 2018 and 2020. In February 2022, Wilson announced that he would not seek re-election in the upcoming 2022 election. Wilson has spoken out in support of increasing the annual salary for state representatives and senators. Wilson currently serves as Ranking Member of the House Aging Committee and a member of both the Appropriations and Environment Committees.

References

Living people
Republican Party members of the Connecticut House of Representatives
People from Litchfield, Connecticut
21st-century American politicians
Year of birth missing (living people)